Chigoziem Charlton "Chig" Okonkwo (born September 8, 1999) is an American football tight end for the Tennessee Titans of the National Football League (NFL). He played college football at Maryland.

Early years
Okonkwo grew up in Powder Springs, Georgia and attended Hillgrove High School. He was born to a Nigerian family. As a junior, he caught 48 passes for 907 yards and 12 touchdowns. Okonkwo was rated a three-star recruit and committed to play college football at Maryland over offers from Georgia Tech and Wisconsin.

College career
Okonkwo caught six passes for 69 yards and a touchdown and also rushed three times for 72 yards and a touchdown during his freshman season. As a sophomore, he had 19 receptions for 201 yards and two touchdowns. Okonkwo missed the 2020 season after he developed myocarditis. As a senior, Okonkwo caught 52 passes for 447 yards and five touchdowns.

Professional career

Okonkwo was selected in the fourth round of the 2022 NFL Draft with the 143rd overall pick by the Tennessee Titans. He made his NFL debut in Week 1 against the New York Giants. In Week 4, against the Indianapolis Colts, he scored his first NFL touchdown on a eight-yard reception from Ryan Tannehill.

References

External links
 Tennessee Titans bio
Maryland Terrapins bio

Living people
American football tight ends
American sportspeople of Nigerian descent
Maryland Terrapins football players
Players of American football from Georgia (U.S. state)
Sportspeople from Cobb County, Georgia
People from Powder Springs, Georgia
Tennessee Titans players
1999 births